is a 2010 Japanese animated action fantasy film based on the Pretty Cure franchise created by Izumi Todo. The film is directed by Takashi Otsuka, written by Isao Murayama, and produced by Toei Animation. The film was released in Japan on March 20, 2010.

Marking the second entry to the Pretty Cure All Stars crossover film series, as well as the second installment to the DX trilogy, the HeartCatch PreCure! team joins the previous Pretty Cure teams on protecting the Rainbow Jewel from an evil entity known as Bottom.

Plot
The HeartCatch PreCure! team: Tsubomi and Erika receives an invitation from Chypre and Coffret to Fairy Park, where mascots and other fairies were working as they were handing out the Miracle Lights, and Coco and Nutts are presenting the Rainbow Jewel in their human forms. Then they encounter Fresh Pretty Cure! team: Love, Miki, Inori and Setsuna, whom are searching for other friends, which Tsubomi agrees to help. As exploring, Northa, Uraganos, Kintoleski and Mucardia appears before them. Both HeartCatch and Fresh team transforms, which shocks Blossom and Marine. As they're fighting, they learn that the villains were revived by an evil entity named Bottom, whom is seeking the Rainbow Jewel. As the latter Pretty Cures shows up, the villains retreat.

As the girls get to know each other, Bottom shows up and takes over the Fairy Park, separating the girls from their mascots. As other revived villains try to attack Tsubomi and Erika, each team assists them reuniting with Chypre and Coffret, one team at a time. As Blossom and Marine arrive where the Rainbow Jewel is located, Bottom absorbs the jewel and transform into a gigantic being. Remembering the promise that they've made, Blossom and Marine sparkle the Miracle Lights and all Pretty Cures receive Rainbow forms, and defeat Bottom with "Rainbow Jewel Solution". With everything back to normal, the girls enjoy themselves at the park.

In the post-credit scene, Tsubomi seems to freak out that she has woken up late, but Erika notices that the girls are waiting for them in front of their house.

Voice cast

HeartCatch PreCure!
Nana Mizuki as Tsubomi Hanasaki/Cure Blossom
Fumie Mizusawa as Erika Kurumi/Cure Marine
Taeko Kawata as Chypre
Motoko Kumai as Coffret

Fresh Pretty Cure!
Kanae Oki as Love Momozono/Cure Peach
Eri Kitamura as Miki Aono/Cure Berry
Akiko Nakagawa as Inori Yamabuki/Cure Pine
Yuka Komatsu as Setsuna Higashi/Cure Passion
Taiki Matsuno as Tart
Satomi Kōrogi as Chiffon

Yes! PreCure 5 GoGo!
Yūko Sanpei as Nozomi Yumehara/Cure Dream
Junko Takeuchi as Rin Natsuki/Cure Rouge
Mariya Ise as Urara Kasugano/Cure Lemonade
Ai Nagano as Komachi Akimoto/Cure Mint
Ai Maeda as Karen Minazuki/Cure Aqua
Eri Sendai as Milk/Kurumi Mimino/Milky Rose
Takeshi Kusao as Coco
Miyu Irino as Natts
Romi Park as Syrup
Wataru Takagi as Bunbee
Taeko Kawata as Princess Chocolat

Futari wa Pretty Cure Splash Star
Orie Kimoto as Saki Hyuuga/Cure Bloom/Cure Bright
Atsuko Enomoto as Mai Mishou/Cure Egret/Cure Windy
Kappei Yamaguchi as Flappy
Miyu Matsuki as Choppy
Yuriko Fuchizaki as Moop, Michiru Kiyū
Akemi Okamura as Fuup, Kaoru Kiyū
Ayaka Saitō as Minori Hyuuga

Futari wa Pretty Cure Max Heart
Yōko Honna as Nagisa Misumi/Cure Black
Yukana as Honoka Yukishiro/Cure White
Rie Tanaka as Hikari Kujo/Shiny Luminous
Tomokazu Seki as Mepple
Akiko Yajima as Mipple
Haruna Ikezawa as Pollun
Asuka Tanii as Lulun

Film character
Kiyoyuki Yanada as Bottom

Returning villain characters include:
Misa Watanabe as Northa
Wataru Takagi as Uraganos
Jūrōta Kosugi as Kintoleski
Yoko Soumi as Arachnea
Isshin Chiba as Karehaan
Keiichi Nanba as Moerumba
Naoko Matsui as Ms. Shitataare
Kazue Komiya as Hadenya
Bin Shimada as Nebatakos
Ryōtarō Okiayu as Mucardia

Production
The film is produced by the same key staff members from Pretty Cure All Stars DX: Everyone's Friends - The Collection of Miracles!: Takashi Otsuka directed the film at Toei Animation, Isao Murayama provided the screenplay, Mitsuru Aoyama designed the characters and provided the animation direction, and both Naoki Satō and Yasuharu Takanashi co-composed the music.

Release
The film was released in theaters in Japan on March 20, 2010.

Reception

Box office
The film debuted at number 2 out of top 10 in the Japanese box office in its opening weekend, later dropped to number 12 in its final weekend.

References

External links

2010s Japanese films
2010 anime films
Pretty Cure films
Toei Animation films
Japanese magical girl films
Crossover anime and manga
Films scored by Naoki Satō
Films scored by Yasuharu Takanashi